Robert Harry Harpham (21 February 1954 – 4 February 2016) was a British Labour Party politician and coal miner. He was the Member of Parliament (MP) for Sheffield Brightside and Hillsborough from the May 2015 general election until he died nine months later. He was succeeded by his widow, Gill Furniss, as the MP for the seat at the ensuing by-election.

Early life and education
Harpham was born on 21 February 1954 in Mansfield, Nottinghamshire, England.

Harpham moved to Sheffield in 1985, and studied at Northern College in Barnsley and the University of Sheffield as a mature student. He graduated from Sheffield with a Bachelor's degree in 1991.

Career

Early career
Harpham left school at 16, and became a coal miner at Clipstone Colliery. He took part in the miners' strike of 1984–85 as an NUM member, staying out for the duration.

Political career
In 2000, Harpham was elected to Sheffield City Council, serving as a councillor for Manor ward. He represented Darnall ward from 2004 onwards, and was deputy leader of the council from 2012. He did not stand at the 2015 council election.

Harpham was elected as the Member of Parliament (MP) for Sheffield Brightside and Hillsborough in the 2015 general election. He was one of the final deep coal miners ever to enter parliament. He was one of 125 MPs who employed a member of their family, in his case, employing his wife as a part-time researcher. He supported Andy Burnham in the 2015 Labour leadership election. He served as Parliamentary Private Secretary (PPS) to Lisa Nandy, the shadow energy secretary. He was a Member of Parliament for 260 days, making him one of the shortest serving MPs.

Personal life
Harpham had a son and a daughter from his first marriage. He was married to Gill Furniss until his death.

Death
Harpham was diagnosed with terminal cancer in October 2015. He died on 4 February 2016, aged 61. On 16 February 2016, a non-religious funeral was held for him at Sheffield Cathedral. Harpham's widow Gill Furniss, a member of Sheffield City Council, won the by-election caused by his death as Labour's candidate.

See also
 List of United Kingdom MPs with the shortest service

References

1954 births
2016 deaths
Alumni of the University of Sheffield
Deaths from cancer in England
Councillors in Sheffield
English miners
Labour Party (UK) MPs for English constituencies
People from Mansfield
UK MPs 2015–2017